Mysterious Journey II, also known as Schizm II: Chameleon, is an adventure game developed by Detalion, published by The Adventure Company, powered by Lithtech: Jupiter, and the sequel to Schizm: Mysterious Journey. Like the earlier game, the plotline was authored by acclaimed Australian science fiction writer Terry Dowling. While Schizm utilized 360 degree panoramas, Mysterious Journey II uses a first-person shooter interface.

Story 
The game begins on a derelict space station. Sen Geder, whom the player controls, awakens from a cryogenic stasis pod, and is interrogated by a pre-recorded holo-message of a mysterious man named Tensa, 214 years after Sen was placed in stasis. Tensa explains that there is no escape, as all non-essential machinery is destroyed, every door and bulkhead is sealed, and the station will fall from its decaying orbit in 16 days. The hologram device is accidentally blown up by a sentient machine named Talen. From there on, Talen helps Sen fly a shuttle down to the planet, where the people below have formed two tribes: The technological Transai, and nature-loving Ansala. From there Sen must solve a myriad of complex puzzles to uncover the truth behind his crime and find out what really happened on Saarpedon.

Reception

In June 2004, Christian Streil of DreamCatcher Interactive's European branch said that "Schizm II has definitely met our expectations" commercially, and that it reassured the company that real-time 3D graphics were "the right track".

References

2003 video games
The Adventure Company games
Adventure games
Detalion games
Single-player video games
Video games developed in Poland
Windows games
Windows-only games